James Perrin Smith (November 27, 1864 – January 1, 1931) was an American geologist and paleontologist.

Smith was of English descent. T. M. Forster, one of his ancestors, was a surgeon in the Royal Navy and moved to Virginia in 1745. His paternal grandfather moved the family from Virginia to South Carolina, and Smith was born on November 27, 1864, near Cokesburg, to James Francis Smith, a planter and traveling preacher. James P. Smith was educated by his parents and elder brother Charles Forster Smith. In the 1870s, the family moved to Spartanburg, South Carolina, where James obtained a bachelor's degree at Wofford College in 1884. Smith then attended Vanderbilt University until 1887, for a master's degree. He subsequently taught high school science and mathematics in Nashville, Tennessee for two years. Smith then worked for the Arkansas Geological Survey under John Casper Branner. Between 1890 and 1892, Smith studied at the University of Göttingen. His doctoral work was supervised by Adolf von Koenen. Smith joined the Stanford University faculty at Branner's invitation upon completing his Ph.D, and retired in June 1930. He died of pneumonia on January 1, 1931 in Palo Alto, California. Smith Creek on northern Ellesmere Island is named after him, and indirectly the Smithian sub-stage of Early Triassic time.

References

1864 births
1931 deaths
American paleontologists
20th-century American geologists
American people of English descent
People from Spartanburg, South Carolina
Wofford College alumni
Vanderbilt University alumni
University of Göttingen alumni
Stanford University faculty
Deaths from pneumonia in California
Members of the United States National Academy of Sciences